Llanfechain railway station is a former station in Llanfechain, Powys, Wales. The station opened in 1865 and closed in 1965. The station site is now a private residence and the trackbed filled in to platform level.

References

Further reading

Disused railway stations in Powys
Railway stations in Great Britain opened in 1865
Railway stations in Great Britain closed in 1965
Former Cambrian Railway stations
Beeching closures in Wales